Brimosaurus (meaning "strong lizard") is an extinct genus of plesiosaur from the Late Cretaceous of what is now Arkansas. The type species is Brimosaurus grandis, first named by Joseph Leidy in 1854. The name Brimosaurus is a nomen dubium: the fossils consist of only a few isolated vertebrae, and in 1952 Welles proposed that Brimosaurus was actually synonymous with Cimoliasaurus (which itself is based on dubious material).

See also
 Timeline of plesiosaur research
 List of plesiosaur genera

References
 Leidy, J. (1854). "Remarks on exhibiting to the Society four vertebrae of a huge extinct Saurian from Arkansas" Proceedings of the Acadademy of Natural Sciences of Philadelphia, 7(3): 72.

External links
 Brimosaurus from Oceans of Kansas

Late Cretaceous plesiosaurs of North America
Taxa named by Joseph Leidy